Crambe is a genus of plants

Crambe may also refer to:

Crambe, North Yorkshire
Crambeck near Crambe in Yorkshire, famous as having been a Roman encampment
Crambe (sponge), a genus of demosponges
Crambe, a genus of about 20 species of annual and perennial flowering plants
Crambe abyssinica, an oilseed crop, native to the Mediterranean
Crambe cordifolia, syn. Crambe glabrata DC. (greater sea kale, colewort, heartleaf crambe), a species of flowering plant
Crambe maritima (common name sea kale, seakale or crambe), a species of halophytic flowering plant in the genus Crambe
Crambe oil,  an inedible seed oil, extracted from the seeds of the Crambe abyssinica